Amelia Kemper von Ende (sometimes Amalie) (June 19, 1856 – August 25, 1932) was a Polish-born American writer, pianist, composer, teacher, and translator.

Born in Warsaw of Polish and French extraction, von Ende emigrated to the United States when she was six, settling with her family in Milwaukee.  She moved at 19 to Chicago, becoming a radical journalist in partnership with her husband, Heinrich von Ende, who died in 1879. The following year she opened a boarding school for girls of German-American extraction, the Minerva Institute. In 1893 she moved to New York City, where she would become a journalist writing for American and German audiences, largely on cultural themes; during her career she would contribute to the Musical Courier, Die Musik of Berlin, the New York Post, and The Nation. She soon became known as an intermediary between the German and American cultures. She championed the work of Emily Dickinson and Walt Whitman, whose poetry she introduced to German-language audiences; she was the first writer to translate Dickinson into German. 1914 saw the publication of her article "Women as a Creative Force in Music" in Musical America.

Von Ende had an active career as a pianist and composer while living in New York, and taught music history at the Von Ende School of Music, which had been founded by her son Herwegh. She also lectured on various topics, including "German Women Writers", "Woman in Music", "Poland, Old & New", "Post-war Literature at home and abroad" and "Three Centuries of French Thought", to women's societies throughout the United States. Her compositions, some of which remain in manuscript, include works for solo voice, chorus, piano, and violin.  She was also known for her literary work, leaving at her death many monographs, works of literary criticism, and translation.  A book on New York was published in Berlin in 1909.  She published a variety of translations during her career, of works by writers including Georges Clemenceau, Carl Hauptmann, Egbert W. Fowler, and Jakob Schaffner.

Von Ende died in New York City. Her papers are held by the New York Public Library.

References

1856 births
1932 deaths
American music journalists
American women journalists
American women composers
19th-century American women pianists
19th-century American pianists
American women classical pianists
American classical pianists
19th-century American journalists
20th-century American journalists
19th-century American translators
20th-century American translators
20th-century American composers
19th-century American women writers
20th-century American women writers
20th-century American writers
Writers from Warsaw
Musicians from Warsaw
Writers from Milwaukee
Journalists from Wisconsin
Polish emigrants to the United States
American people of French descent
Lecturers
Place of birth missing
20th-century American women pianists
20th-century American pianists
19th-century American composers
Classical musicians from Wisconsin
20th-century women composers
19th-century women composers